Evernia esorediosa is a species of lichen in the family Parmeliaceae. It has no soralia, but many ascocarps.

In a study it has been found that its mycobiont contains hypostrepsilic acid, a dibenzofuran. It made up 3.2% of the dry weight. In its lichenized condition divaricatic acid, an orcinol depside, made up 1.9% of Evernia esorediosa's dry weight.

Distribution
Specimens have been found in Japan, Russia, the United States of America, Canada and Mongolia.

References

Parmeliaceae
Lichen species
Lichens described in 1891
Lichens of Japan
Lichens of Eastern Europe
Lichens of North America
Taxa named by Johannes Müller Argoviensis
Lichens of Mongolia